Uncial 0176 (in the Gregory-Aland numbering), is a Greek uncial manuscript of the New Testament, dated paleographically to the 4th century (or 5th).

Description 
The codex contains a small part of the Epistle to the Galatians (3:16-25), on one parchment leaf (12 cm by 7 cm). It is written in one column per page, 22 lines per page, in a small uncial letters. 

The Greek text of this codex is mixed. Aland placed it in Category III. 

Currently it is dated by the INTF to the 4th or 5th century. It was examined by Guglielmo Cavallo.

The codex currently is housed at the Laurentian Library (PSI 251) in Florence.

See also 

 
 List of New Testament uncials
 Textual criticism

References

Further reading 

 Publicazioni della Società Italiana (Papiri Greci e Latini) II, 251 ed. G. Vitelli. 
 M. Naldini, Documenti dell’Antichita Cristiana (Firenze, 1965), no. 18.

External links 
 Biblioteca Medicea Laurenziana

Greek New Testament uncials
4th-century biblical manuscripts